Mustafa Tamer Başar (born January 19, 1946) is a control and game theorist who is the Swanlund Endowed Chair and Center for Advanced Study  Professor  of Electrical and Computer Engineering at the University of Illinois at Urbana-Champaign, USA. He is also the Director of the Center for Advanced Study (since 2014).

Education 
Tamer Başar received a B.S. in Electrical Engineering from Boğaziçi University (formerly known as Robert College) at Bebek, in İstanbul-Turkey, in 1969, and M.S., M.Phil., and Ph.D. in engineering and applied science from Yale University, in 1970, 1971 and 1972, respectively.

Academic life 
He joined the University of Illinois at Urbana–Champaign - Electrical and Computer Engineering Department in 1981. He was the founding president of the International Society of Dynamic Games during 1990–1994, the president of the IEEE Control Systems Society in 2000, and the president of the American Automatic Control Council during 2010–2011. He received the Medal of Science of Turkey in 1993, H.W. Bode Lecture Prize of the IEEE Control Systems Society in 2004, Georgia Quazza Medal of the International Federation of Automatic Control in 2005, the Richard E. Bellman Control Heritage Award in 2006, Isaacs Award of the International Society of Dynamic Games in 2010, and IEEE Control Systems Award in 2014. He was elected as a member of National Academy of Engineering in 2000 in Electronics, Communication & Information Systems Engineering and Industrial, Manufacturing & Operational Systems Engineering for the development of dynamic game theory and application to robust control of systems with uncertainty. He is a Fellow of IEEE, IFAC, and SIAM.

Honorary degrees and chairs 
He has been awarded Honorary Doctor of Science degrees and Honorary Professorships from:
Honorary Professorship, Shandong University, Jinan, China, 2019
Honorary Chair Professorship from Tsinghua University, Beijing, China in 2014 
Honorary Doctorate (Doctor Honoris Causa) from Boğaziçi University, Istanbul, Turkey in 2012 
Honorary Doctorate from the National Academy of Sciences of Azerbaijan in 2011 
Honorary Professorship from Northeastern University, Shenyang, China  in 2008 
Honorary Doctorate (Doctor Honoris Causa) from Doğuş University, Istanbul, Turkey in 2007 
Swanlund Endowed Chair Professorship at UIUC in 2007

Research areas 
His research interests include optimal, robust, and nonlinear control; large-scale systems; dynamic games; stochastic control; estimation theory; stochastic processes; and mathematical economics.

References

External links 
List of game theorists
List of members of the National Academy of Engineering (Electronics)

Boğaziçi University alumni
Academic staff of Boğaziçi University
Yale School of Engineering & Applied Science alumni
University of Illinois Urbana-Champaign faculty
Members of the United States National Academy of Engineering
Living people
1946 births
Game theorists
Control theorists
Communication theorists
Turkish academics
Turkish scientists
Turkish mathematicians
Turkish electrical engineers
American electrical engineers
American academics of Turkish descent
Fellow Members of the IEEE
Fellows of the Society for Industrial and Applied Mathematics
Richard E. Bellman Control Heritage Award recipients